FED-STD-209 E Airborne Particulate Cleanliness Classes in Cleanrooms and Cleanzones was a federal standard concerning classification of air cleanliness, intended for use in environments like cleanrooms. The standard based its classifications on the measurement of airborne particles.

Cancellation
The standard was canceled on November 29, 2001 by the United States General Services Administration (GSA). The document was superseded by standards written for the International Organization for Standardization (ISO).

References

External links
Institute of Environmental Sciences and Technology
Critical Distinctions Between Clean Room Carts and Laboratory Carts
ISO 14644-1 Cleanroom Classifications

Air filters
Standards of the United States
Cleanroom technology